The Suwalong Hydropower Station, is the hydropower project 
It is the first installed million-kilowatt-level hydropower station in Tibet.

With a total investment of ¥ 17.89 billion, the plant's total installed capacity is 1.2 million kilowatts,  which is more than double that of the Zangmu Dam. Once completed, the project would generate 2,000 MW of power.

History
In November, 2015, the National Development and Reform Commission officially approved the construct of Suwalong Hydropower Station.

On November 21, 2017, Suwalong Hydropower Station dammed the river.

The plant became fully operational in November 2022.

References 

Jinsha River
Dams in China
Hydroelectric power stations in Tibet
Hydroelectric power stations in Sichuan